In Greek mythology, Laodice ("people-justice") was the daughter of Priam of Troy and Hecuba. She was described as the most beautiful of Priam's daughters. The Iliad mentions Laodice as the wife of Helicaon, son of Antenor, although according to Hyginus she was the wife of Telephus, king of Mysia and son of Heracles.

Mythology 
Before the outbreak of the Trojan War, Laodice fell in love with Acamas, son of Theseus, who had come to Troy to try to recover Helen through diplomatic means. She became pregnant and bore him the son Munitus. The later was given to Acamas' grandmother Aethra, who was then a slave to Helen. After the war had ended, Acamas took his son with him. Much later, Munitus was bitten by a snake while hunting with his father in Thrace and died.

According to the Bibliotheca and several other sources, in the night of the fall of Troy Laodice feared she might become one of the captive women and prayed to the gods. She was swallowed up in a chasm that opened on the earth.

Pausanias, however, mentions her among the captive Trojans painted in the Lesche of Delphi.  He assumes that she was subsequently set free because no poet mentions her as a captive, and he further surmises that the Greeks would have done her no harm, since she was married to a son of Antenor, who was a guest-friend of the Greeks Menelaus and Odysseus.

Notes

References 

 Gaius Julius Hyginus, Fabulae from The Myths of Hyginus translated and edited by Mary Grant. University of Kansas Publications in Humanistic Studies. Online version at the Topos Text Project.
 Homer, The Iliad with an English Translation by A.T. Murray, Ph.D. in two volumes. Cambridge, MA., Harvard University Press; London, William Heinemann, Ltd. 1924. Online version at the Perseus Digital Library.
 Homer, Homeri Opera in five volumes. Oxford, Oxford University Press. 1920. Greek text available at the Perseus Digital Library.
 Parthenius, Love Romances translated by Sir Stephen Gaselee (1882-1943), S. Loeb Classical Library Volume 69. Cambridge, MA. Harvard University Press. 1916.  Online version at the Topos Text Project.
 Parthenius, Erotici Scriptores Graeci, Vol. 1. Rudolf Hercher. in aedibus B. G. Teubneri. Leipzig. 1858. Greek text available at the Perseus Digital Library.
 Pausanias, Description of Greece with an English Translation by W.H.S. Jones, Litt.D., and H.A. Ormerod, M.A., in 4 Volumes. Cambridge, MA, Harvard University Press; London, William Heinemann Ltd. 1918. Online version at the Perseus Digital Library
 Pausanias, Graeciae Descriptio. 3 vols. Leipzig, Teubner. 1903.  Greek text available at the Perseus Digital Library.
 Pseudo-Apollodorus, The Library with an English Translation by Sir James George Frazer, F.B.A., F.R.S. in 2 Volumes, Cambridge, MA, Harvard University Press; London, William Heinemann Ltd. 1921. Online version at the Perseus Digital Library. Greek text available from the same website.
 Quintus Smyrnaeus, The Fall of Troy translated by Way. A. S. Loeb Classical Library Volume 19. London: William Heinemann, 1913. Online version at theio.com
 Quintus Smyrnaeus, The Fall of Troy. Arthur S. Way. London: William Heinemann; New York: G.P. Putnam's Sons. 1913. Greek text available at the Perseus Digital Library.
 Tryphiodorus, Capture of Troy translated by Mair, A. W. Loeb Classical Library Volume 219. London: William Heinemann Ltd, 1928. Online version at theoi.com
 Tryphiodorus, Capture of Troy with an English Translation by A.W. Mair. London, William Heinemann, Ltd.; New York: G.P. Putnam's Sons. 1928. Greek text available at the Perseus Digital Library.
Princesses in Greek mythology
Queens in Greek mythology
Children of Priam
Women of the Trojan war
Trojans
Prisoners of war in popular culture